Luma sericea is a moth in the family Crambidae. It was described by Arthur Gardiner Butler in 1879. It is found in Japan, Taiwan, China, India (Assam) and Burma.

The wingspan is about 11 mm.

References

Moths described in 1879
Spilomelinae